The Hughes-Morgan Baronetcy, of Penally in the County of Pembroke, is a title in the Baronetage of the United Kingdom. It was created on 27 June 1925 for Sir David Hughes-Morgan, Chairman of the Western Mail. Born David Morgan, he assumed by deed poll the additional surname of Hughes in 1925.

Hughes-Morgan baronets, of Penally (1925)
Sir David Hughes-Morgan, 1st Baronet (1871–1941)
Sir John Vernon Hughes-Morgan, 2nd Baronet (1900–1969)
Sir David John Hughes-Morgan, 3rd Baronet (1925–2006)
Sir Ian Parry David Hughes-Morgan, 4th Baronet (born 1960)

Notes

References
Kidd, Charles, Williamson, David (editors). Debrett's Peerage and Baronetage (1990 edition). New York: St Martin's Press, 1990,

External links
 Daily Telegraph Obituary of Sir David Hughes-Morgan, 3rd Baronet

Hughes-Morgan